Dindicodes crocina is a moth of the family Geometridae, first described by Arthur Gardiner Butler in 1880. It is found in northern India.

References

Moths described in 1880
Pseudoterpnini